Carthamartha is a hamlet in the Tamar valley  east of Treburley and  south of Launceston in Cornwall, England, UK. It is in the civil parish of Lezant.

References

Hamlets in Cornwall